KRMD (1340 AM, "Lite Rock 100.7") is a mixed soft adult contemporary and normal adult contemporary formatted radio station licensed to Shreveport, Louisiana and serving the Ark-La-Tex region. The station is owned by Cumulus Media and based at the Louisiana Boardwalk in Bossier City, Louisiana. The station's transmitter is just southwest of the I-20/I-49 interchange in Shreveport, coincidentally across the street from a separate transmitter housing its sister stations, its FM partner, KMJJ-FM, KVMA-FM and KQHN.

Programming
Former programming was a mixture of political talk with syndicated hosts Neal Boortz, G. Gordon Liddy, and Bill O'Reilly and sports talk with Tim Brando.

As of the 2006 NFL season, KRMD is the local affiliate for the Dallas Cowboys.

The station plays Christmas music every November and December. In 2022, it was the first station to change to Christmas music for the season, after it unceremoniously flipped to Christmas music on October 28 and other stations who traditionally flipped earlier declined to do so in 2022.

History
KRMD was originally licensed and put on the air by R. M. Dean. Therefore the callsign with RMD in it. The original license was issued in May 1928 with original power of 50 and 100 watts. (See Early history of KWKH and other Shreveport radio stations) The station was founded by the late T. B. Lanford of Shreveport. In 1959, Thomas Austin Gresham (1921-2015), a 1946 graduate of Louisiana State University in Baton Rouge who was born in Buenos Aires, Argentina, came to Shreveport to manage KRMD. He was thereafter the executor of the Lanford estate from 1978 until his retirement a decade later. While in Shreveport, Gresham served for a year on the Caddo Parish Selective Service Board and was active in Rotary International and the American Contract Bridge League. Earlier, he had opened radio station KLOU and was the manager and part owner of KAOK, both in Lake Charles, Louisiana. He was a decorated first lieutenant with the 8th Air Force of the United States Army Air Corps in England during World War II. He flew twenty combat missions in B-17 bombers.

Until 2005, KRMD was "1340 The Zone" and was the only all-sports station in the "Ark-La-Tex."

On December 17, 2012, KRMD changed its format to sports, branded as "Sports Talk 100.7". using the frequency of its FM translator (K264AS) in its branding.

On March 9, 2020, Cumulus Media flipped KRMD and K264AS from a sports radio format to soft AC, as Lite Rock 100.7, Shreveport-Bossier's New At Work Radio Station.

Translators

Construction permit
On January 26, 2006, the station was granted a construction permit by the Federal Communications Commission to alter the station's coverage patterns with different daytime and nighttime signals, although the power would remain at 400 watts both day and night. This construction permit expired on January 26, 2009.

Previous Logos

References

External links

Radio stations in Louisiana
Soft adult contemporary radio stations in the United States
Mainstream adult contemporary radio stations in the United States
Cumulus Media radio stations